Jane Jensen is an American video game designer and author.

Jane Jensen may also refer to:

 Jane Jensen (cricketer), a former Danish international cricketer
 Jane Jensen (musician), an American actress, producer and musician